Bapir-e Sofla (also Romanized as Bāpīr-e Soflá) is a village in Gowavar Rural District, Govar District, Gilan-e Gharb County, Kermanshah Province, Iran. At the 2006 census, its population was 34, in 9 families.

References 

Populated places in Gilan-e Gharb County